The Changan Raeton (睿骋) is a mid-size sedan produced by Changan Automobile. The Raeton is Changan's flagship and largest sedan.

Overview

Changan Raeton debuted at the 2012 Beijing Auto Show and was launched on the Chinese car market in 2013.

During the 2013 Auto Shanghai, a stretched version of the Raeton was unveiled while the production Raeton sedan is powered by a 1.8-liter turbo engine producing .

According to the updated official website in 2018, the pricing of the post-facelift Changan Raeton ranges from 120,800 to 150,800 yuan RMB. The Raeton is designed by the Changan design center in Turin, Italy, just like the CS35 CUV and Eado sedan.

References

External links

Official website

Changan Automobile vehicles
Front-wheel-drive vehicles
Cars of China
Mid-size cars
Sedans
Cars introduced in 2012
2010s cars